St Brendan's Board GAA is one of several divisions in the Kerry GAA system. It is based in the north of the county and fields teams from under-15 right up senior level.

Member clubs

 Ardfert
 Churchill
 John Mitchels
 Na Gaeil
 St Patrick's, Blennerville

History

At the County Board Convention in 1924 it was decided to subdivide Kerry into four divisions. North, South, East and West Kerry were the original four divisions. Further divisions were established in subsequent years, with several rural clubs in the Tralee area affiliating to the St Brendan's Board. In 2021, the St Brendan's Board and Tralee Town Board merged to form just one District Board.

Honours

Kerry Senior Football Championship: Runners-up: 1957, 1958, 1992

References

Divisional boards of Kerry GAA
Gaelic games clubs in County Kerry